, usually referred by fans as Saint Seiya Myth Cloth, is a popular toy-line from Bandai based on the Saint Seiya franchise, originated by Masami Kurumada's manga It is based on the Saint Seiya franchise by Masami Kurumada is his characters. The title of the merchandise is also known as Saint Myth Cloth or Saint Seiya Myth Cloth Legend, but the general consensus usually refers to it by the aforementioned title. It was originally intended to release 'only' the 5 Bronze Saints to commemorate the series 12th anniversary and for the anticipated Hades Arc OVA in the year 2003. (Hades — Chapter Sanctuary, 2003), but then it continued with the production of action figures on almost all the characters of the eighties animated series.
Note:Most of the numerous action figures produced over the years are mainly to the characters from the classic Saint Seiya series from the 1980s.

Since its introduction in 2003, the line-up has spawn to mostly all the characters in the Saint Seiya universe and has gain mostly positive reviews from old and new collectors as well as fans. Aside from normal releases, limited editions, and characters from Saint Seiya: The Lost Canvas(of this series have been produced, however, only two characters). The figure(s) having a vast improvement over the '80s vintage figures, introduces better articulation and is capable of posing and revoking some of the action portrayed by the characters in the animation; and the high detailed molding and sculpting produce a highly detailed resemblance of the characters seen in the animation as well. Due to all the new technology and high end approach in molding and sculpting, Saint Cloth Myth figures are costly compared to its predecessor but that does not stop its success and demand.

In 2007, Bandai released a 'side' line-up called Saint Seiya Myth Cloth Appendix. The line-up is focused on half size bust of the characters, characters in their casual outfits, and Pandora boxes for the cloths. Due to the higher detailed and enhanced sculpting for the specific line-up, it is intended to either display it as a half bust size figure or you can change/swap the head and cloth parts with existing Saint Seiya Myth Cloth Legend figures to enhance their aesthetics.

In May 2011 Bandai announced the expansion of a whole new line-up from the Myth Cloth series - Saint Seiya Myth Cloth EX & Saint Seiya Cloth Crown. A renovation of the figures for a better mobility and articulation. Both line-up are larger in size, with Crown having the most substantial size difference scaling 12" (30 cm) tall. Special effects are included (sold separately) as well as different facial expressions of the characters.

During the Tamashii Nations Summer Collection 2014 held in May, Bandai announced to further expand the Myth Cloth line by introducing a new line-up called Saint Myth Cloth Legend. It follows the Myth Cloth line up but will only be focused on characters seen in the 2014 Toei Animation CG animated Saint Seiya: Legend of Sanctuary movie. Though the movie carnation of Sagittarius Aiolos and Pegasus Seiya was first to be revealed, the movie version of Gemini Saga is to be the first one to be released in this line.
In 2017 production of Action figures began on the canonical sequel Saint Seiya: Next Dimension

Line-Up

Line-up Specials

Saint Seiya Myth Cloth Legend Exclusive Display Stands

Campaign Exclusive

Japanese Magazine Exclusive

Tamashii Nation Event & Festival Event (aka - FES) Exclusive

Tamashii Japanese Web Store Exclusive

Toei Limited Exclusive

Saint Seiya Myth Cloth Appendix

Saint Seiya Myth Cloth Appendix (聖闘士聖衣神話 Appendix) is another popular toy-line diverse from the Saint Seiya Myth Cloth line-up. In 2007, Bandai first announced this project. The line-up is focused on half size bust of the characters, characters in their casual outfits, and Pandora boxes for the cloths. Due to the higher detailed and sculpting for the specific line-up, it is intended to either display it as a half bust size figure alone or you can change/swap the head and cloth parts with existing Saint Seiya Myth Cloth figures to enhance their aesthetics.

Appendix Line-Up

Tamashii Nation Event & Festival Event (aka - FES) Exclusive

Tamashii Nation Japanese Web Store Exclusive

Saint Seiya Cloth Crown

Saint Seiya Cloth Crown (聖闘士聖衣皇級) is whole new line-up derived from the popular Saint Seiya Myth Cloth toy-line from Bandai. The title of the merchandise is also known as 'Saint Cloth Crown', 'Saint Seiya Myth Cloth Crown', but the general consensus usually refer to the aforementioned title. Bandai first officially unveiled the project along with the Saint Seiya Myth Cloth EX at May 2011.

Whilst sharing the same name under the Myth Cloth family, the Crown figure(s) substantial difference is the size scaling 12" (30 cm) tall. Bandai has clearly stated that the line-up is targeted towards a high price market. Due to the size and high cost of the figure(s), Bandai has stated they will release the Crown figures once per year. So far Bandai has announced the release of 3 Saints. It is not known yet if they intend to release other Saints in the future. Like the EX line-up the Crown figures have the same redesigned and upgraded articulation allowing high mobility enabling a wide range or movement especially in their cloths. Crown figure(s) will also be packed with the characters different facial expressions as seen portrayed in the anime.

Crown Line-Up

Saint Seiya Myth Cloth EX

Saint Seiya Myth Cloth EX (聖闘士聖衣神話EX) is a whole new line-up derived from the Saint Seiya Myth Cloth toy-line from Bandai. The title of the merchandise is also known as 'Saint Cloth Myth EX', and 'Saint Myth Cloth EX' but the general consensus usually refer to the aforementioned title. Bandai officially unveiled the project along with the Saint Seiya Cloth Crown at May 17, 2011.

EX figures are slightly larger than their counterparts. Originally the 12 Gold Saints were the only ones to be announced, but it didn't take long till Bandai expand it towards the other Saints. The major selling point of the EX figures is the complete renovation of the figures articulation. While the Myth Cloth figures have very limited mobility, the EX figures have been designed to maximize their mobility enabling a wide range of articulation even when the figures are in their cloth. EX figures will also be packed with the characters different facial expressions as well as special effects parts to invoke some of the special moves as depicted in the anime.

EX Line-Up

Line-up Specials

Tamashii Japanese Web Store Exclusive

Tamashii Nation Event Exclusive

Campaign Exclusive

External links
Official Saint Seiya Myth Cloth website (Japanese)

References

Action figures
Bandai brands
Japanese die-cast toys
Myth Cloth